Sunday (The Gospel According to Iso) is the sixth studio album by Australia vocal duo Vika and Linda Bull and was released on 11 September 2020.

At the AIR Awards of 2021, the album won Best Independent Blues and Roots Album or EP.

Background and release
When the first COVID-19 pandemic lockdown began in Melbourne in March 2020, Vika and Linda Bull decided to sing one gospel song each Sunday morning for their followers on social media. The weekly performance became known as the "Sunday Sing Song". Vika said "It's kept our spirits up and we've had great feedback from people".

Following the feedback, the sisters decided to record an album of gospel songs. Music director Cameron Bruce played piano from his home in New South Wales and sent the files to Melbourne where the sisters added the vocals.

In a statement, the Linda said "Gospel is a genre we know we can do faithfully. It doesn't feel laboured for us, it feels like a release and when we sing these songs, we feel better. And when that happens, hopefully people will feel the same way." Vika added "Gospel music has been a huge influence on the way we sing; We love the rawness and minimal instrumentation of the early recordings of the great vocal powerhouses like Sister Rosetta Tharpe, Aretha Franklin and Mahalia Jackson."

The tracklist originated from a list of 175 songs Paul Kelly sent Vika and Linda several years ago. During the lockdown they cycled through the songs and eventually settled on 12, plus an original, "Shallow Grave" written by Kasey Chambers and Harry Hookey.

Critical reception
Jeff Jenkins from Stack Magazine said "You don't have to be a believer to dig these tunes" saying, "There's something special about siblings singing together and the sisters' voices beautifully complement each other. Vika's vocal takes no prisoners, grabbing you by the scruff of the neck, whereas Linda's voice lures the listener with its subtler tone." Jenkins said "a standout is a three-way duet with Paul Kelly".

Track listing

Charts

Release history

References

2020 albums
Vika and Linda albums
Bloodlines (record label) albums